The following list shows a compact version of the colors in the list of colors A–F, G–M, and N–Z articles. The list shows the color swatch and its name. Hovering over the color box shows the HSV, RGB, and #hex values for the color in the tool tip. All values and conversions are in the sRGB color space, which is an inappropriate assumption for some entries.

List of colors

A

B

C

D

E

F

G–H

I–K

L

M

N–O

P–Q

R

S

T

U–V

W–Z

See also 
 List of colors by shade

External links 

.compact
.compact
.compact